Singer Corporation is an American manufacturer of consumer sewing machines, first established as I. M. Singer & Co. in 1851 by Isaac M. Singer with New York lawyer Edward C. Clark. Best known for its sewing machines, it was renamed Singer Manufacturing Company in 1865, then the Singer Company in 1963. It is based in La Vergne, Tennessee, near Nashville. Its first large factory for mass production was built in 1863 in Elizabeth, New Jersey.

History

Singer's original design was the first practical sewing machine for general domestic use. It incorporated the basic eye-pointed needle and lock stitch, developed by Elias Howe, who won a patent-infringement suit against Singer in 1854.

Singer obtained  in August 1851 for an improved sewing machine that included a circular feed wheel, thread controller, and power transmitted by gear wheels and shafting.

Singer consolidated enough patents in the field to enable him to engage in mass production, and by 1860 his company was the largest manufacturer of sewing machines in the world. In 1885 Singer produced its first "vibrating shuttle" sewing machine, an improvement over contemporary transverse shuttle designs (see bobbin drivers). The Singer company began to market its machines internationally in 1855 and won first prize at the Paris world's fair that year. The company demonstrated the first workable electric sewing machine in 1910. Singer was also a marketing innovator and a pioneer in promoting the use of installment payment plans.

Early sales figures

By 1876, Singer was claiming cumulative sales of two million sewing machines and had put the two millionth machine on display in Philadelphia.

Singer in Scotland

In 1867, the Singer Company decided that the demand for their sewing machines in the United Kingdom was sufficiently high to open a local factory in Glasgow on John Street. The Vice President of Singer, George Ross McKenzie selected Glasgow because of its iron making industries, cheap labour, and shipping capabilities. Demand for sewing machines outstripped production at the new plant and by 1873, a new larger factory was completed on James Street, Bridgeton. By that point, Singer employed over 2,000 people in Scotland, but they still could not produce enough machines.

These were connected by three wings. Sir Robert McAlpine was the building contractor and the factory was designed to be fire proof with water sprinklers, making it the most modern factory in Europe at that time.

With nearly a million square feet of space and almost 7,000 employees, it was possible to produce on average 13,000 machines a week, making it the largest sewing machine factory in the world. The Clydebank factory was so productive that in 1905, the U.S. Singer Company set up and registered the Singer Manufacturing Company Ltd. in the United Kingdom. Demand continued to exceed production, so each building was extended upwards to 6 storeys high. A railway station with the company name was established in 1907 with connections to adjoining towns and central Glasgow to assist in transporting the workforce to the facility. Increased productivity came from 'scientific management' techniques which increased workloads whilst keeping salary overheads low, and in 1911, a mass walk out of 10,000 workers, the 'Singer Strike', took place  in support of twelve women polishers, who had seen three staff dismissed, but the workload remained the same with no extra pay. It was significant in its recognition of  the rights of women workers and 'collective bargaining' and predated the labour movement known as 'Red Clydeside'. A centenary film was made by the BBC about the female workers who stood up to the American management. 

In the First World War, sewing machine production gave way to munitions. The Singer Clydebank factory received over 5000 government contracts, and made 303 million artillery shells, shell components, fuses, and aeroplane parts, as well as grenades, rifle parts, and 361,000 horseshoes. Its labour force of 14,000 was about 70% female at war's end.

From its opening in 1884 until 1943, the Kilbowie factory produced approximately 36,000,000 sewing machines. Singer was the world leader and sold more machines than all the other makers added together. In 1913, the factory shipped 1.3 million machines. The late 1950s and 1960s saw a period of significant change at the Clydebank factory. In 1958, Singer reduced production at their main American plant and transferred 40% of this production to the Clydebank factory in a bid to reduce costs. Between 1961 and 1964, the Clydebank factory underwent a £4 million modernization program which saw the Clydebank factory cease the production of cast iron machines and focus on the production of aluminium machines for western markets. As part of this modernisation programme, the famous Singer Clock was demolished in 1963. At the height of its productiveness in the mid 1960s, Singer employed over 16,000 workers but by the end of that decade, compulsory redundancies were taking place and 10 years later the workforce was down to 5,000. Financial problems and lack of orders forced the world's largest sewing machine factory to close in June 1980, bringing to an end over 100 years of sewing machine production in Scotland. The complex of buildings was demolished in 1998.

An archive about the factory, the strike and the history of its business in Scotland, is regarded as a recognised collection of national significance by Museums Galleries Scotland.

Marketing

The Singer sewing machine was the first complex standardized technology to be mass marketed. It was not the first sewing machine, and its patent in 1851 led to a patent battle with Elias Howe, inventor of the lockstitch machine.  This eventually resulted in a patent sharing accord among the major firms.  Marketing strategies included focusing on the manufacturing industry, gender identity, credit plans, and "hire purchases."

Singer's marketing emphasized the role of women and their relationship to the home, evoking ideals of virtue, modesty, and diligence. Though the sewing machine represented liberation from arduous hand sewing, it chiefly benefited those sewing for their families and themselves.  Tradespeople relying on sewing as a livelihood still suffered from poor wages, which dropped further in response to the time savings gained by machine sewing.  Singer offered credit purchases and rent-to-own arrangements, allowing people to rent a machine with the rental payments applied to the eventual purchase of the machine, and sold globally through the use of direct-sales door-to-door canvassers to demonstrate and sell the machines.

In the late 60s/early 70s, Singer sponsored rock and roll concerts to help advertise a variety of products including a line of Singer record players.  The 1971 concert series was broadcast by WPLJ New York from the A&R Recording Studios and included the Paul Butterfield Blues Band, Seatrain, Procol Harum, Incredible String Band, Mother Earth, and Delaney & Bonnie and Friends. In 1968, Singer sponsored "Singer Presents  ... Elvis", commonly referred to as the '68 Comeback Special.

World War II 
During World War II, the company suspended sewing machine production to take on government contracts for weapons manufacturing. Factories in the United States supplied the American forces with Norden bomb sights and M1 Carbine rifle receivers, while factories in Germany provided their armed forces with weapons.

In 1939, the company was given a production study by the government to draw plans and develop standard raw material sizes for building M1911A1 pistols. The following April 17, Singer was given an educational order of 500 units with serial numbers S800001 – S800500. The educational order was a program set up by the Ordnance Board in the U.S. to teach companies without gun-making experience to manufacture weapons.

Singer delivered 500 units to the U.S. government. Although Singer was unable to produce 100 guns a day, which the government contract required, the War Department was impressed with the quality of their pistols and asked the company to produce navigation and targeting equipment components. The pistol tooling and manufacturing machines were transferred to Remington Rand whilst some went to the Ithaca Gun Company. Approximately 1.75 million 1911A1 pistols were produced during World War II, making original Singer pistols relatively rare and collectable. In 2017, one sold at auction for $414,000.

In December 1940, Singer won a contract to produce the M5 Antiaircraft Director, a version of the UK-designed Kerrison Predictor. The US Army had previously adopted the M7 Computing Sight for their 37 mm gun M1 anti-aircraft guns, but the gun proved temperamental and Sperry Corporation was too busy producing other systems to build the required number of M7's. After testing in September 1940, the Army accepted the Kerrison as the M5, and later, the Bofors 40 mm gun in place of the M1.

Post-war 
Singer resumed developing sewing machines in 1946. After the not so well received Singer 206k, a first attempt in zig-zag machines, starting production in 1936, They introduced one of their most popular, highest-quality and fully-optioned machines in 1957, the 401 Slant-o-Matic. 2011 marked their 160th anniversary. Currently, they manufacture computerized, heavy duty, embroidery, quilting, serging, and mechanical sewing machines.

In 2017, they launched their new Singer Sewing Assistant App.

Diversification

In the 1960s, the company diversified, acquiring the Friden calculator company in 1965 and General Precision Equipment Corporation in 1968. Friden became Singer Business Machines which produced the Singer System 10. GPE included Librascope, The Kearfott Company, Inc, and Link Flight Simulation. In 1968 also, Singer bought out GPS Systems and added it to the Link Simulations Systems Division (LSSD). This unit produced nuclear power plant control room simulators in Silver Spring,  Maryland: Tech Road building for Boiling Water Reactor (BWR), Parkway building for Pressurized Water Reactor (PWR) and later moved to Broken Land Parkway in Columbia, Maryland while flight simulators were produced in Binghamton, New York. 

By 1971 Singer was also producing portable/home audio/visual equipment as evidenced by the Singer-branded record and cassette tape players and film-strip viewers that can be found on e.g., eBay.  In order to support this venture, Singer sponsored concerts such as the 1971 A&R Studio concerts on WPLJ-New York mentioned above.

For several years in the 1970s, Singer set up a national sales force for CAT phototypesetting machines (of UNIX troff fame) made by another Massachusetts company, Graphic Systems Inc. This division was purchased by Wang Laboratories in 1978.

In 1987, corporate raider Paul Bilzerian made a "greenmail" run at Singer, and ended up owning the company when no "White Knight" rescuer appeared.  To recover his money, Bilzerian sold off parts of the company. Kearfott was split, the Kearfott Guidance & Navigation Corporation was sold to the Astronautics Corporation of America in 1988 and the Electronic Systems Division was purchased the Plessey Company in 1988 and renamed Plessey Electronic Systems (and then acquired by GEC-Marconi in 1990, renamed GEC-Marconi Electronic Systems, and later incorporated into BAE Systems). The four Link divisions developing and supporting industrial and flight simulation were sold to Canadian Avionics Electronics (CAE) and became CAE-Link. The nuclear power simulator division became S3 Technologies, and later GSE Systems, and relocated to Eldersburg, MD.  The Sewing Machine Division was sold in 1989 to Semi-Tech Microelectronics, a publicly traded Toronto-based company.

20th century

Sales and profits grew until the 1940s. The market was affected in several ways. The USA market matured after WWII. Japanese manufacturers ate into the market with zig-zag sewing machines. Under the leadership of Donald P. Kircher, Singer diversified into markets such as office equipment, defense, and aerospace. Revenue of which 90% of revenue from sewing machines was reduced to 35% after diversification.

In 1978 Singer moved its HQ from Rockefeller Plaza to Stamford, Conn. This relocation moved 430 jobs to the new location.

During the 1980s Singer sewing machine markets were being hit with Japanese machines and European brands including Bernina, Pfaff, and Viking. In 1986, the original Singer company spun off its sewing machine business under the name SSMC. In 1989 Semi-Tech Global purchased SSMC renaming SSMC back to Singer. Semi-Tech Global incorporated Singer into Singer N.V. based in Netherlands Antilles owned by the Hong Kong holding company.

Singer N.V. filed bankruptcy in 1999 and was acquired by Kohlberg & Company. In 1997, Singer (Singer N.V.) US operations moved its consumer products to LaVergne, Tennessee. This location also served its wholesale distribution of sewing machines and parts. In 2006 The parent company of Singer - Kohlberg & Company, acquired Husqvarna and Pfaff brands. This merged the three brands into the current company the SVP Group. Its main competitors are Baby Lock, Bernina, Brother, Janome, Juki and Aisin Seiki.

Singer was heavily involved in Manhattan real estate in the 1800s through Edward C. Clark, a founder of the company. Clark had built The Dakota apartments and other Manhattan buildings in the 1880s. In 1900, the Singer company retained Ernest Flagg to build a 12-story loft building at Broadway and Prince Street in Lower Manhattan. The building is now considered architecturally notable, and it has been restored.

The 47-story Singer Building, completed in 1908, was also designed by Flagg, who designed two landmark residences for Bourne. Constructed during Bourne's tenure, the Singer Building  (demolished in 1968) was then the tallest building in the world and was the tallest building to be intentionally demolished until the Twin Towers of the World Trade Center were destroyed in the September 11 attacks.

At their Clydebank factory, Singer built a  clock tower, which stood over the central wing and had the reputation of being the largest four-faced clock in the world. Each face weighed five tons, and it took four men fifteen minutes twice a week to keep it wound. The tower was demolished in 1963,17 years before the factory closed in 1980 and is now the site of Clydebank Business Park. Singer railway station, built to serve the factory, is only one of two railway stations in the UK, named after a factory, and is still in operation today.

The famous Singer House, designed by architect Pavel Suzor, was built in 1902–1904 at Nevsky Prospekt in Saint Petersburg as headquarters of the Russian branch of the company. This modern style building (situated just opposite the Kazan Cathedral) is officially recognized as an object of Russian historical-cultural heritage.

In 2018, a large factory fire destroyed a Singer distribution office and warehouse in Seven Hills, Sydney.  Singer had manufactured sewing machines in Australia at a purpose-built plant in the western Sydney suburb of Penrith, from 1959 until 1967.

List of company presidents
Isaac M. Singer (1851–1863)
Inslee Hopper (1863–1875)
Edward C. Clark (1875–1882)
George Ross McKenzie (1882–1889)
Frederick Gilbert Bourne (1889–1905)
Sir Douglas Alexander (1905–1949)
Milton C. Lightner (1949–1958)
Donald P. Kircher (1958–1975)
Joseph Bernard Flavin (1975–1987)
Paul Bilzerian (1987–1989)
Iftikhar Ahmed (1989–1997)
Stephen H. Goodman (1998–2004)

Popular domestic Singer sewing machines

See also
History of the sewing machine
List of sewing machine brands

References

Further reading
Brandon, Ruth. A Capitalist Romance: Singer and the Sewing Machine (Lippincott, 1977).
Davies, Robert Bruce. Peacefully Working to Conquer the World: Singer Sewing Machines in Foreign Markets, 1854–1920 (Arno Press, 1976).

Godley, Andrew. "The Global Diffusion of the Sewing Machine, 1850–1914". Research in Economic History 20#1 (2001): 1–46.
Godley, Andrew. "Selling the Sewing Machine Around the World: Singer's International Marketing Strategies, 1850–1920", Enterprise & Society (2006) 7#2 pp. 266–314.
Godley, Andrew. "Singer in Britain: the diffusion of sewing machine technology and its impact on the clothing industry in the United Kingdom, 1860–1905". Textile History 27.1 (1996): 59–76.
Jack, Andrew B. "The channels of distribution for an innovation: The sewing-machine industry in America, 1860–1865". Explorations in Economic History 9.3 (1957): 113.
Weber, Nicholas Fox. The Clarks of Cooperstown: Their Singer Sewing Machine Fortune, Their Great and Influential Art Collections, Their Forty-year Feud (Alfred A. Knopf, 2007).
Wickramasinghe, Nira. "Following the Singer Sewing Machine: Fashioning a Market in a British Crown Colony," in Metallic Modern: Everyday Machines in Colonial Sri Lanka. (Berghahn Books, 2014) pp. 16–40. .

External links

Singer Direct Singer history timeline
Singer in WWII Singer's contribution to the war effort
Singer sewing machine serial numbers and dates
Sewing Machines, Historical Trade Literature  Smithsonian Institution Libraries
Singer Manufacturing company records at Newberry Library
Singer Company records  (1851–1990) at Hagley Museum and Library
Singer Manufacturing Company Records  (1860–1878) at Hagley Museum and Library

Sewing machine brands
Vacuum cleaner manufacturers
Manufacturing companies based in Tennessee
Rutherford County, Tennessee
American companies established in 1851
Manufacturing companies established in 1851
1851 establishments in New York (state)
Clark family
Historic American Engineering Record in New Jersey
American subsidiaries of foreign companies
1989 mergers and acquisitions
2006 mergers and acquisitions
Home appliance manufacturers of the United States